Paget is a surname of Anglo-Norman origin which may refer to:

 Lord Alfred Paget (1816–1888), British soldier, courtier and politician
 Almeric Paget, 1st Baron Queenborough (1861–1949), British cowboy, industrialist, yachtsman and politician
 Sir Arthur Paget (British Army officer) (1851–1928), British Army general
 Sir Bernard Paget (1887–1961), British Army general
 Lady Caroline Paget (1913–1973), British socialite and actress
 Charles Paget, 6th Marquess of Anglesey (1885–1947), British soldier
 Charles Paget, 8th Marquess of Anglesey (born 1950), British nobleman
 Charles Paget (conspirator) (c. 1546–1612), Roman Catholic conspirator
 Charles Paget (politician) (1799–1873), MP for Nottingham in the 1850s
 Charles Paget (Royal Navy officer) (1778–1839), MP and vice-admiral
 Charles Souders Paget (1874–1933), American architect in Canton, China
 Christopher Paget (born 1987), English cricketer
 Clara Paget (born 1988), British model and actress
 Lord Clarence Paget (1811–1895), Royal Navy admiral, politician and sculptor
 Debra Paget (born 1933), American actress and entertainer
 Dorothy Paget (1905–1960), British racehorse owner and sponsor of motor racing
 Sir Edward Paget (1775–1849), British Army general
 Edward Paget (bishop) (1886–1971), English bishop
 Francis Paget (1851–1911), English theologian, author and Bishop of Oxford
 Francis Edward Paget (1806–1882), English clergyman and author
 George Paget, 7th Marquess of Anglesey (1922–2013), British soldier and author
 Henry Paget (disambiguation), several people
 Sir James Paget (1814–1899), English surgeon and pathologist
 Jock Paget (born 1983), New Zealand equestrian
 John Paget (priest) (died 1638), pastor at the English Reformed Church, Amsterdam
 John Paget (author) (1808–1892), English agriculturist and writer on Hungary
 John Paget (barrister) (1811–1898), English police magistrate and author
 Julian Paget, soldier and military historian, son of General Sir Bernard
 Michael Paget (born 1978), Welsh musician, singer, songwriter, and guitarist
 Reginald Paget (1908–1990), British lawyer and politician
 Rosalind Paget (1855-1948), British nurse, midwife and reformer
 Sidney Paget (1860–1908), British illustrator of Sherlock Holmes stories
 Stephen Paget  (1855–1926), English surgeon
 Thomas Paget (disambiguation), several people
 Walter Trueman Paget (1854–1930), farmer and politician in Queensland, Australia
 William Paget (disambiguation), several people

First name
 Paget Toynbee (1855–1932), British scholar
 Paget Brewster (born 1969), American actress

Place
 Paget Parish, Bermuda
 Paget Peak, a mountain in British Columbia, Canada
 Paget Island, Bermuda
 Paget Marsh Nature Reserve, Bermuda
 Mount Paget, highest peak on South Georgia island

See also
 Paget baronets
 Paget's disease (disambiguation), diseases described by Sir James Paget
 Paget process, early technique for colour photography
 Operation Paget, British police inquiry into the death of Diana, Princess of Wales
 Paget Rangers, semi-professional football team
 Padgett (surname)

References

English-language surnames